Outpost Transmission is a 2002 studio album by the British electronic music group 808 State. It is their sixth studio album, and their first new material since 1996's Thermo Kings.

Guests on this album were: Simon Lord (Simian) on "606", Guy Garvey (Elbow) on "Lemonsoul", and Alabama 3 on "Crossword".

It is also their final studio recording to feature Darren Partington, as he left the band after being jailed for 18 months in January 2015 for dealing heroin and crack cocaine.

UK track listing
 "606"  – 4:58
 "Chopsumwong" – 5:18
 "Wheatstraw" – 4:54
 "Boogieman" – 4:40
 "Roundbum Mary" – 3:44
 "Lemonsoul"  – 3:20
 "Suntower" – 5:56
 "Dissadis" – 5:53
 "Bent" – 4:59
 "Souflex" – 4:58
 "Crossword"  – 2:58
 "Lungfoo" – 4:29
 "Slowboat" – 5:16
 "Yoyo" – 6:58

US track listing
 "606"  – 4:58
 "Chopsumwong" – 5:18
 "Wheatstraw" – 4:54
 "Lemonsoul"  – 3:20
 "Suntower" – 5:56
 "Bent" – 4:59
 "Souflex" – 4:58
 "Crossword"  – 2:58
 "Lungfoo" – 4:29
 "Quincy's Lunch" – 5:02
 "Dissadis" – 5:53
 "Doctors and Nurses" – 6:39
 "Brown Sauce" – 5:33
 "Long Orange (Testa)" – 5:00

Japanese track listing
 "606"  – 4:58
 "Chopsumwong" – 5:18
 "Wheatstraw" – 4:54
 "Boogieman" – 4:40
 "Roundbum Mary" – 3:44
 "Lemonsoul"  – 3:20
 "Suntower" – 5:56
 "Dissadis" – 5:53
 "Bent" – 4:59
 "Souflex" – 4:58
 "Crossword"  – 2:58
 "Lungfoo" – 4:29
 "Slowboat" – 5:16
 "Yoyo" – 6:58
 "Quincy's Lunch" – 5:02

O.T.E.P. 
In 2012, the band released a free EP with four tracks from the Japanese and North America versions of the album. 

 Long Orange (Testa) – 5:02
 Doctors & Nurses – 6:41
 Quincy's Lunch (Testa) – 5:04
 Brown Sauce – 5:33

References

External links
Outpost Transmission (Album)

2002 albums
2003 albums
808 State albums